Faina may refer to:

Faina, Goiás, Brazil
Ukrainian ship MV Faina
Fainá, fainâ, or farinata, pancake of chickpea flour

People with the given name
Faina Chiang Fang-liang, née Ipat'evna Vakhreva (1916–2004), First Lady of the Republic of China
Faina Jyrkilä (1917–2008), Finnish sociologist
Faina Kirschenbaum (born 1955), Israeli politician
Faina Melnik (1945–2016), Ukrainian-born Olympic champion discus thrower
Faina Petryakova (1931–2002), Ukrainian academic
Faina Ranevskaya (1896–1984), Soviet actress

People with the surname
Gianfranco Faina (died 1981), Italian historian